Tillandsia callichroma is a species of flowering plant in the genus Tillandsia. This species is endemic to Mexico.

References
 

callichroma
Flora of Mexico